Leonardo Bragaglia (c. 1932 – August 1, 2020) was an Italian actor, director and essayist.

References

1930s births
2020 deaths
People from Anzio
Italian essayists
Male essayists
20th-century Italian male actors
21st-century Italian male actors
Italian male non-fiction writers